Jashpur State, was one of the princely states of India during the period of the British Raj. The town of Jashpur was the former state's capital. The rulers were Rajputs of the Chauhan dynasty.

After the Independence of India Jashpur State was merged with the princely states of Raigarh, Sakti, Sarangarh and Udaipur to form the Raigarh district of Madhya Pradesh. Now the district of Raigarh is part of Chhattisgarh state.

History
The area of Jashpur State was ruled by a Dom dynasty at the time of the Mughal Empire. Sujan Rai, a son of the Suryavanshi Raja of Banswada in Rajputana, arrived to the place and saw that the population were not satisfied with their ruler, Raibhan Dom. Sujan led a rebellion, defeated the Dom Raja in battle, and killed him, proclaiming himself king.

The Chauhan Rajput rajas of Jashpur accepted the sovereignty of the Bhonsle dynasty of Nagpur State, paying a tribute of 21 buffalos. Before 1818 the Bhonsle placed Jashpur State under the administration of Surguja State. The state became a British protectorate in 1818.

Jashpur was one of the states of the Eastern States Agency. The last ruler of this princely state signed the accession to the Indian Union on 1 January 1948.

Rulers
The rulers of Jashpur State bore the title of 'Raja'.

Rajas (Pre-Independence of India)

Titular Rajas (Post-Independence of India) 

*Between 1948 to 1973 Upendra Singh, son of Vijay Bhushan served as Yuvraj (Prince) of Jashpur State but unfortunately on February 24, 1973, Singh died with unknown reasons.

See also
Chota Nagpur States
Eastern States Agency
Political integration of India

References

External links
Jashpur (Princely State)

Jashpur district
History of Chhattisgarh
Princely states of India
Rajputs
18th-century establishments in India
1948 disestablishments in India